The Spanish colonial bridges in Tayabas are bridges built during the Spanish-colonial era in Tayabas, Quezon. The city government of Tayabas declared eleven bridges in the city as Historical bridges of Tayabas for protection purposes. These are the bridges of Alitao, Isabel II, Urbiztondo, Don Francisco de Asis, Bai, Despedidas, Ese, Princesa, Malagonlong, Lakawan and Mate. In 2011, ten bridges in Tayabas was declared as National Cultural Treasure under the Historic Bridges of Tayabas. The declared national cultural treasures under the list are the bridges of Alitao, Isabel II, Don Francisco de Asis, Gibanga, Malagonlong, Lakawan, Mate, Ese, Despedida, Tumuloy and Princesa.

Tayabas Historic Bridges
The Tayabas Historic Bridges is a group of existing Spanish-colonial era bridges in Tayabas, Quezon declared by the National Museum of the Philippines as a National Cultural Treasure on August 12, 2011.

Other Spanish-colonial era bridges
Besides the declaration of the National Museum on National Cultural Treasures and the city government of Tayabas on historic bridges, all Spanish colonial era bridges are declared cultural properties (part of the Philippine Registry of Cultural Property) under the National Cultural Heritage Act.

References

External links 

Bridges in the Philippines
Spanish colonial infrastructure in the Philippines
Buildings and structures in Tayabas